Ilam Park is a  country park situated in Ilam, on both banks of the River Manifold five miles (8 km) north west of Ashbourne, England, and in the ownership of the National Trust. The property is managed as part of the Trust's White Peak Estate.

(Ashbourne, the 'post town', is in Derbyshire and thus so is Ilam's postal address, but the Park, and Ilam, are in Staffordshire the county boundary being the River Dove).

The property consists of Ilam Hall and remnants of its gardens, an ancient semi-natural woodland — Hinkley Wood — designated as a Site of Special Scientific Interest (SSSI), noted for its small-leaved and large-leaved limes and their hybrids.

Ilam Hall

The estate was owned from the 16th century, for over 250 years, by the Port family. It was sold to David Pike Watts in 1809. On his death in 1816, the old hall was inherited by his daughter who had married Jesse Russell. Russell (as Jesse Watts-Russell, High Sheriff of Staffordshire in 1819 and Conservative MP for the rotten borough of Gatton) commissioned James Trubshaw to build a new Hall to  designs by John Shaw; the Hall, now a Grade II* listed building, was built between 1821 and 1826.

By the early 1930s it had been sold for demolition. The demolition was well advanced when Sir Robert McDougal bought it for the Trust, on the understanding that the remaining parts (the entrance porch and hall, the Great Hall and the service wing) be used as an International Youth Hostel. Today Ilam Hall is leased to the Youth Hostels Association (England & Wales) (YHA).

References

 Michael Raven, A Guide to Staffordshire and the Black Country (2004), p. 182 (Google Books)

External links

 Ilam Park information at the National Trust

Country parks in Staffordshire
Country houses in Staffordshire
National Trust properties in Derbyshire
National Trust properties in Staffordshire
Grade II* listed buildings in Staffordshire
Youth hostels in England and Wales
Tourist attractions of the Peak District